Eucorys bartschi is a species of large sea snail, a marine gastropod mollusk in the family Cassidae, the helmet snails and bonnet snails.

Description 
The maximum recorded shell length is 135 mm.

Habitat 
Minimum recorded depth is 128 m. Maximum recorded depth is 1061 m.

References

External links

Cassidae
Gastropods described in 1943